Ottaviano Dandini was the son of Pietro Dandini, and painted history in the style of his father. Some fresco paintings in the cloister of San Spirito, a picture of several Saints in San Lorenzo, and his works in the church of the Magdalene at Pescia, evince the respectability of his talent. He afterward entered the Society of Jesus, and died about 1750.

References
 

Year of birth unknown
Year of death unknown
18th-century Italian painters
Italian male painters
Painters from Tuscany
18th-century Italian Jesuits
18th-century Italian male artists